What the Dickens! is a 1963 recording by Johnny Dankworth, accompanied by his orchestra and guests, some of the leading UK jazz musicians of the day. It is a suite based on characters and scenarios associated with Charles Dickens. It was recorded in London on July 29 and 31, August 7, October 4, 1963 and released as a vinyl album.

Track listing
"Prologue" (2:26)
"Weller Never Did" Pickwick Papers (1:58)
"Little Nell" The Old Curiosity Shop (2:51)
"The Infant Phenomenon" Nicholas Nickleby (2:12)
"Demdest Little Fascinator" Nicholas Nickleby (3:09)
"Dotheboys Hall" Oliver Twist (4:24)
"Ghosts" A Christmas Carol (2:23)
"David and the Bloaters" David Copperfield (2:57)
"Please Sir, I Want Some More" Oliver Twist (2:01)
"The Artful Dodger" Oliver Twist (1:39)
"Waiting for Something to Turn Up" David Copperfield (2:46)
"Dodson and Fogg" Pickwick Papers (1:55)
"The Pickwick Club" Pickwick Papers (3:15)
"Serjeant Buzfuz" Pickwick Papers (2:15)
"Finale" (2:29)

Personnel

Guests
Tubby Hayes – tenor saxophone
Ronnie Ross - baritone saxophone
Ronnie Scott - tenor saxophone
Dick Morrissey – tenor saxophone
Jimmy Deuchar - trumpet
Ron Stephenson – drums
Bobby Wellins – tenor saxophone
Ken Napper – bass
Tony Coe - tenor saxophone, clarinet
Peter King - tenor saxophone
David Snell - harp

Orchestra
Leader: John Dankworth
Gus Galbraith - trumpet
Leon Calvert - trumpet, flugelhorn
Dickie Hawdon - trumpet, tenor horn
Kenny Wheeler - trumpet, tenor horn
Tony Russell - trombone
Eddie Harvey - valve trombone
Ron Snyder - tuba
Roy East  - alto saxophone, flute, clarinet
John Dankworth - alto saxophone, clarinet
Vic Ash - tenor saxophone, clarinet
Art Ellefson - tenor saxophone, bass clarinet
Alan Branscombe - vibraphone, xylophone, piano
Spike Heatley - basses
Johnny Butts - drums
Roy Webster - percussion

1963 albums
John Dankworth albums
Fontana Records albums